Christie is an audiovisual company headquartered in Cypress, California.

History

Christie was founded in 1929 by S.L. Christie in California. It made a name for itself as a manufacturer of 35mm film movie projectors, lamp houses, lamp consoles and film platter systems. It acquired the Kitchener, Ontario-based digital projection business of Electrohome in 1999. Christie was the first licensee of Texas Instruments' Digital Light Processing technology.

As of 2019, more than 65,000 Christie projectors have been installed worldwide, powering 10 million screenings. 

Christie acquired Vista Controls Systems in 2007, makers of video processing systems, including the Spyder. 

In 2009, Christie launched MicroTiles, modular 16" × 12" (408 mm × 306 mm) LED-powered DLP-based units that can be built together into a large video wall-style display. 

In 2013, Christie launched the Matrix StIM WQ and Matrix SIM WQ projectors. These projectors were designed for simulation and training applications and included Christie AccuFrame smear-reduction technology. 

In 2015, Christie acquired Coolux, best known for its Pandoras Box product family of media and show control systems. In the same year, Christie launched a new projection system using RGB laser technology with colors approaching Rec. 2020 color space.

In 2019, Christie launched MicroTiles LED, a direct-view LED display consisting of a mounting chassis and three rectangular modules which snap onto the chassis via magnets.

References

Display technology companies
Film and video technology
Companies based in Kitchener, Ontario